The Forestland Enhancement Program (FLEP) was adopted in the 2002 farm bill (P.L. 107-171, Sec. 8002) as an amendment to the Cooperative Forestry Assistance Act of 1978 (P.L. 95-313; 16 U.S.C. 2101 et seq.). FLEP replaces the Stewardship Incentives Program (SIP) and the Forestry Incentives Program (FIP). FLEP is optional in each state and is a voluntary program for non-industrial private forest (NIPF) landowners. It provides for technical, educational, and cost-share assistance to promote sustainability of the NIPF forests. The law provided FLEP with $100 million from the CCC through FY07. Half of these funds were diverted to wildfire control in 2003, and $40 million of those funds have not been replenished and the spending authority has been cancelled.

References

External links
Forestland Enhancement Program, from the United States Forest Service

United States Department of Agriculture programs